The 2023 Geelong Football Club season is the club's 159th season playing Australian rules football, with the club competing in their 124th season in the Australian Football League (AFL). Geelong will also field a women's team in the 2023 AFL Women's season, and a men's and women's reserves team in the Victorian Football League (VFL) and the VFL Women's (VFLW) respectively.

AFL team

Season summary
It was the club's thirteenth AFL season under senior coach Chris Scott, with Patrick Dangerfield appointed as club captain, replacing the retired Joel Selwood.

Pre-season

Geelong defeated  in a pre-season scratch match at GMHBA Stadium played over eight periods with both senior and reserves players. The final score was Geelong 31.34 (220) versus Hawthorn 18.25 (133). Geelong also played an official AFL practice match against  on 2 March, and were defeated 13.13 (91) versus Geelong's 6.9 (45). Geelong's home-and-away season began on 17 March against  at the Melbourne Cricket Ground (MCG).

Coaching staff
Chris Scott continued as the club's men's senior coach for a thirteenth season, having signed a two-year contract extension until the end of the 2024 season.

Playing list

Changes

Statistics

Results

Ladder

VFL team

Season summary
 2022 VFL premiers coach Mark Corrigan was appointed as coach of Geelong's VFL team in October 2022, replacing Shane O'Bree who had been promoted to the club's AFL program. Corrigan had previously played with the club from 2011 to 2014 and was a member of the club's 2012 VFL premiership team.

Results

Ladder

AFL Women's team

Season summary

VFLW team

Season summary
Former Geelong player Elise Coventry was appointed as the club's VFL Women's coach in December 2022, replacing Andrew Bruce. Coventry was joined by assistant coaches Anna Teague, Alf Della Monica and Aiden Yelland.

Results

Ladder

Notes

References

External links 
 Official website of the Geelong Football Club

2023
Geelong Football Club